Manpur may refer to:

 Manpur, Bhopal, a village in Madhya Pradesh, India
 Manpur, Bihar, a town in India
 Manpur, Indore, a town in Madhya Pradesh, India
 Manpur, Janakpur
 Manpur, Jharkhand, a town in India
 Manpur, Khiron, a village in Uttar Pradesh, India
 Manpur, Lumbini
 Manpur, Nepal (disambiguation), several places
 Manpur, Pakistan
 Manpur, Rapti
 Manpur, Umaria
 Manpur Mainapokhar
 Manpur Tapara
 Bisunpurwa Manpur

See also
 Manipur (disambiguation)